The canton of Les Portes du Tarn is an administrative division of the Tarn department, southern France. It was created at the French canton reorganisation which came into effect in March 2015. Its seat is in Saint-Sulpice-la-Pointe.

It consists of the following communes:
 
Ambres
Coufouleux
Garrigues
Giroussens
Loupiac
Lugan
Saint-Agnan
Saint-Jean-de-Rives
Saint-Lieux-lès-Lavaur
Saint-Sulpice-la-Pointe

References

Cantons of Tarn (department)